Dobryatino is a rural locality (a village) in Butylitskoye Rural Settlement, Melenkovsky District, Vladimir Oblast, Russia. The population was 28 as of 2010.

Geography 
Dobryatino is located 29 km northwest of Melenki (the district's administrative centre) by road. Kuzmino is the nearest rural locality.

References 

Rural localities in Melenkovsky District
Melenkovsky Uyezd